The Copa Federación Centro, or the Castilian Federation Cup, was a football competition contested by the best clubs from Central Spain (which encompassed Madrid and the wider Castile region). It was the second-tier competition for the said region after the Campeonato Regional Centro. The competition was formed and reformed numerous times in its 20-year-history between 1923 and 1943, going from a knock-out format to a league mode of all against all. Throughout the editions, the Castilian Cup took different names. Its first version was known as the Copa Madrid (1923–28), then it developed into the Copa Castilla (1933–34), and Copa Presidente de la Federación Castellana (1940–44). The Castilian Federation Cup had five known editions, although it is probable that there are others, such as Copa Primavera (1941–43) and Copa José Luis del Valle (1943–45).

Great figures played at this tournament, such as Santiago Bernabéu, Monchín Triana, René Petit, and José María Peña.

History

1922–23 Copa Federación Centro
The first edition of this competition was held between 6 May and 17 June 1915 in Madrid and was contested by all the Madrid teams in a single-match knock-out tournament under the denomination of Copa Federación Centro (also known at the time as the Copa Madrid). After the first two knockout rounds, Athletic de Madrid and Real Madrid reached the final that took place on 17 June at the newly-opened Estadio Metropolitano.

In the first half, Madrid scored twice through crosses from Gerónimo del Campo and strikes from Santiago Bernabéu, helped in the second by a mistake by Pololo, but the hosts fought back and equalized shortly after courtesy with two quick goals, a header from Monchín Triana and a free kick launched by Luis Olaso. This served as a wake-up call for the Madrid team, who responded with a relentless wave of attacks on Athletic's goal, who failed to resist, conceding four more goals: A superb shot by Posada broke the tie, and after this, Antonio de Miguel, Bernabéu and Posada sealed the game. Thus Real Madrid won the cup.

Results

Final

Real Madrid line-up: Martínez; Escobal, Quesada; Sicilia, Mengotti, Mejía; De Miguel, Posada, Bernabéu, Pérez, Del Campo.

Athletic line-up: Ortueta; Olalquiaga, Pololo; Fajardo, Burdiel, Marín; Bustillo, Ortiz de la Torre, Triana, Dunwater, Olaso.

1927–28 Copa Federación Centro
It was a single match disputed by the Regional Championship champion Athletic de Madrid and the runner-up Real Madrid on 7 June 1928 at the Chamartín stadium. The local team won by three goals to nil. The game was organized by the Castilian Football Federation, which also donated the trophy.

Results

Real Madrid line-up: Cabo; Quesada, Urquizu, Prats, Esparza, Peña, Cominges, Pérez, Rubio, López, Benegas.

Athletic line-up: Vidal; Lafuente, A. Olaso, Santos, Ordóñez, Joaquín, De Miguel, Luís Marín, Palacios, Galatas, L. Olaso.

1933–34 Copa Castilla
The Castillian Cup was organized again for the 1933–34 season under the denomination of Copa de Castilla, as a means to fill a calendar lacking in matches, especially due to the participation of the Spanish national team in the 1934 World Cup held in Italy. It was developed with a phase prior to a single match in which several teams had to be eliminated to reach the final phase in which five teams were automatically classified (Madrid FC, AD Ferroviaria, Athletic de Madrid, CD Nacional de Madrid and the guest Racing de Santander). The final phase consisted of elimination rounds between eight teams, for which the quarterfinals, semifinals and final were played.

It was disputed by clubs from the Castilian Federation (preliminary phase) of the First Category (with the exception of Club Valladolid Deportivo), plus the first three of the Second Category of Madrid and the first two of the North and South sections. The final was played by Athletic Club de Madrid and Club Deportivo Nacional de Madrid, the latter winning by four goals to three.

Results

Previous phase 

Qualified for the quarterfinals: Sociedad Alcántara, RCD Carabanchel and UD Salamanca.

Final phase

Final

CD Nacional line-up: Joven; Muñoz, Suárez; Sánchez, Otero, Zulueta; Sanz, Moriones, López Herranz, San Emeterio, Aja.

Athletic line-up: Pacheco; Corral, Mandaro; Peña, Basterrechea, Losada; Liz, Guijarro, Arocha, Amunárriz, Buiría.

1940–41 Copa Presidente Federación Castellana
The competition was resumed in 1941, as a means to resume the regional championships in central Spain that had been suppressed after the restructuring of the Royal Spanish Football Federation following the Spanish Civil War. The main reason, however, was the complete consolidation and success of the competitions at the national level.
For this reason, it was renamed the Copa Presidente Federación Castellana, having its renewed dispute in the 1940–41 season.

The contest was played over two legs, the first on 15 June at the Chamartín Stadium and the second on June 22 at the Vallecas Stadium, where Atlético temporarily played until the reconstruction work of the Metropolitan Stadium was completed (it had been destroyed in the Civil War). Atlético-Aviación was champion of the competition for the first time after a 3–1 aggregate win against its neighbors and historical rivals, Real Madrid, the absolute dominators of the regional tournaments of Castile.

Results

1943–44 Copa Presidente Federación Castellana
This edition was disputed again by the same contenders from the previous edition, as representatives in the First Division of Castilian football, due to the fact that the Central Regional Championship was no longer disputed. A single match final was played, with Real Madrid winning.

Results

Real Madrid line-up: Bañón; Querejeta, Corona, Sauto, Tamargo; Huete, Alonso II, Moleiro; Barinaga (Elías 70´), Belmar (Pruden 45´), Cuca.

Athletic line-up: Abel (Caballero 45´); Jimeno, Cobo, Ameztoy, Germán; Machín (García 85´), Domingo, Casaus; Martín, Calixto, Vázquez (Alcalde 45´).

Champions

List of winners

Most successful teams 
Including the Copa Primavera and Copa José Luis del Valle, Real Madrid CF is the most successful team with five titles, followed by CD Toledo with four titles, and with only one title is CD Nacional de Madrid, Club Atlético-Aviación (now Atlético de Madrid), Getafe Deportivo (now Getafe CF), CD Guadalajara and UD San Lorenzo.

Notes

References

External links
 Spain - List of Champions of Campeonato Regional Centro RSSSF archives

Defunct football competitions in Spain
 P
Recurring sporting events established in 1923
Recurring sporting events disestablished in 1953
1923 establishments in Spain
1943 disestablishments in Spain